The 2017 Corsican territorial elections were held on 3 and 10 December 2017 to elect 63 members of the Corsican Assembly who in turn will determine the composition of the Executive Council of Corsica. The elections, held only two years after the 2015 territorial elections, were called as a result of the planned creation of a single collectivity within Corsica resulting from the mergers of two departments (Haute-Corse and Corse-du-Sud) and the existing territorial collectivity of Corsica.

The nationalist alliance Pè a Corsica between autonomist Femu a Corsica and separatist Corsica Libera won an outright majority of seats in the assembly under the list led by Gilles Simeoni.

Background 
Territorial elections to elect the Corsican Assembly were held on 3 and 10 December as a result of the creation of a single collectivity replacing the existing departments of Haute-Corse and Corse-du-Sud and the existing territorial collectivity of Corsica on 1 January 2018. While the creation of a territorial collectivity was rejected by voters in Corsica in a 2003 referendum, the 42 of 51 members of the Corsican Assembly voted in support of a proposal to create a single territorial collectivity on 12 December 2014, with the support of the national government. The initiative was pushed by nationalists on the island, who won a majority of seats in the 2015 territorial elections, who argued that the division of Corsica into separate departments produced "nests of clientelism".

While the duration of the term of the assembly is usually six years, the elections will be held early on the occasion of the creation of the single collectivity, with the territorial elections still planned for 2021.

From 1 January 2018, the two departments will be dissolved, with the capital based in Ajaccio and an advisory "chamber of territories" in Bastia composed of local elected officials alongside the assembly. The assembly will expand from 51 to 63 members, with the executive council to expand from 9 to 11 members (including the president).

Electoral system 
Unless a single list receives a majority of votes in the first round, a second round will be held, in which lists obtaining at least 7 percent of the overall vote in the first round will automatically advance, while those receiving between 5 and 7 percent will be offered the chance to merge with a list that received at least 7 percent of the vote. In the second round, the list receiving a plurality of votes will receive an 18% bonus representing 11 seats in the assembly, with the remaining seats allocated proportionally based on the vote percentage for each list.

The newly elected assembly then appoints the members of the executive council by a first-past-the-post vote requiring an absolute majority, voting on a list of 11 individuals – the president and ten councilors to the president.

Lists and candidates 

Following the start of the official campaign on 20 November, seven lists will be presented in Corsica, with the ecologist list of Jean-Francois Baccarelli, "A voce di a natura corsa", suspended due to a lack of funds. No list of the Socialist Party (PS) or Radical Party of the Left (PRG) will be presented due to the conviction and imprisonment of Paul Giacobbi for embezzlement of public funds in January 2017.

The nationalist alliance between autonomist Femu a Corsica and separatist Corsica Libera, Pè a Corsica, was renewed for the 2017 elections under Gilles Simeoni, but did not directly address the question of independence. A second nationalist list, "Core in fronte" representing Rinnovu, was presented by Paul-Félix Benedetti, supporting a self-determination referendum to restore an independent Corsican state and critical of a disorderly "mafia society" on the island. While Benedetti proposed an alliance with Pé a Corsica, Simeoni rejected the idea. Jean-Charles Orsucci obtained the nomination of La République En Marche! (REM), while the National Front (FN) presented a list, "Rassemblement pour une Corse républicaine", led by Charles Giacomi. Two opposing lists on the right failed to receive the nomination of The Republicans (LR). Valérie Bozzi, LR mayor of Grosseto-Prugna-Porticcio, leads the list "Voir plus grand", with the unofficial support of the party, while Jean-Martin Mondoloni leads a regionalist right list, "La voie de l'avenir, a strada di l'avvene". "La Corse Insoumise", supporters of Jean-Luc Mélenchon, allied with the French Communist Party (PCF) under the list "L'avenir, la Corse en commun – L'avvene, a Corsica in cummunu"; however, the list lacks the support of La France Insoumise, with Mélenchon denouncing any alliance with the PCF.

After the first round, Jacques Casamarta announced that his list would not join an alliance in order to compete in the second round. Paul-Félix Benedetti, leader of Rinnovu, also ruled out any alliance with Pé a Corsica, as he had during the campaign. Jean-Charles Orsucci, leader of the "Andà Per Dumane !" list, rejected an alliance against the nationalists. Though Jean-Martin Mondoloni and Valérie Bozzi, the leaders of the two lists on the right, made contact the evening of the election, an alliance was considered unlikely, given the degree of the nationalists' success in the first round. Mondolini stated the following day that the two lists would not merge, meaning that four lists contested the second round.

Results

References

External links 
Results of past regional elections from the Ministry of the Interior 

Politics of Corsica
2017 elections in France
December 2017 events in France
Corse
Elections in Corsica